Stefano Maiorano (born 30 August 1986, in Campagna) is an Italian football midfielder who currently plays for ASD Calcio Biancavilla.

Appearances on Italian Series 

Serie C1 : 47 Apps, 2 Goals

Serie C2 : 20 Apps

Serie D : 38 Apps, 2 Goals

Total : 105 Apps, 4 Goals

External links
 
 Stefano Maiorano at aic.football.it 
 

Italian footballers
1986 births
Living people
Association football midfielders
A.S.D. Sorrento players
Cavese 1919 players
U.S. Ancona 1905 players
A.C.R. Messina players
U.S. Catanzaro 1929 players
S.S. Juve Stabia players
Paganese Calcio 1926 players
Taranto F.C. 1927 players
Latina Calcio 1932 players
Serie C players
Serie D players